Kinna McInroe (born April 30, 1973) is an American actress, known for her role as Nina in the film Office Space. She has guest-starred in episodes of several television series, has appeared in a number of feature and direct-to-video films, has worked extensively in short films, and has been narrating a series of online videos released under the pseudonym Squirrel-Monkey since 2012.

Life and career beginnings
McInroe studied improvisational theatre with Gary Austin, the founder of The Groundlings. From her first appearance as Nina in the 1999 film Office Space, through to her appearance as Darlene in the early 2009 short film Love Never Tires, McInroe had a very different body shape than she does now.

Videos
Working with Dutch comedy video artist Jo Luijten, McInroe provides the narration on several web videos they have released under the pseudonym Squirrel-Monkey. Most of the Squirrel-Monkey videos show what social networking sites and video games might have looked like if created on the computers of the 1980s or 1990s. 
Since their introduction in March 2012, the videos have received positive press from a number of news and technology websites, including Mashable, Wired and The Huffington Post.

Filmography

Feature films and short films

Television series

Online

References

External links

1973 births
Living people
20th-century American actresses
21st-century American actresses
Actresses from Texas
American film actresses
American television actresses
People from Levelland, Texas